3for3 is an American Christian music trio from Nashville, Tennessee. They started making music in 2015, with their first extended play, The EP, that was released by Maxx Recordings. The songs, "Halfway" and "Keep It 100", both charted on the Billboard magazine charts.

Background
They are a Christian pop trio established in Nashville, Tennessee in 2015. The group members are Josh Davis, Spencer Lloyd, and Benji Shuler.

Music history
The trio started as a musical entity in 2015, with their first release, an extended play, The EP, that was released on July 24, 2015, by Maxx Recordings. The singles, "Halfway" and "Keep It 100", charted on the Billboard magazine Christian Airplay charts, where they peaked at Nos 40 and 29, correspondingly.

Members
Current members
 Josh Davis
 Spencer Lloyd
 Benji Shuler

Discography
EPs
The EP (July 24, 2015, Maxx)
Singles

References

External links
Official website

American Christian musical groups
Musical groups from Nashville, Tennessee
2015 establishments in Tennessee
Musical groups established in 2015